Watersheddings was the site of a former rugby league stadium in the Watersheddings area of Oldham in Greater Manchester, England. Historically it was in Lancashire, lying on the A672 (Ripponden Road) approximately 2 miles north east of Oldham town centre.

Watersheddings  was reportedly the highest professional RL ground in the UK at 770 ft above sea level, which would also list it as the highest ground of any professional sport in the UK.

Origins 
The stadium known as Watersheddings, named after the area of Oldham that it was located in, was built in 1889. It was constructed on the east side of a reservoir, Ruby Mill and Longfield Mill and north of Longfield Lane. At the same time the Oldham Cricket Ground was built adjacent to the stadium on its east side and a lawn tennis ground was constructed on its north side.

History 
Oldham Football Club (more commonly known as Oldham Rugby League Football Club) moved from their Clarksfield Ground and played their first match at the new Watersheddings stadium on 28 September 1889 against Swinton.

In 1904 Watershedding was selected to host the very first Rugby league International between England and Other Nationalities on New Year's Day 1904 but the game was cancelled due to a frozen pitch, and held instead in April at Central Park, Wigan. In 1912, the stadium achieved its highest ever attendance of 28,000 against Huddersfield. In the 1914/15 season Watershedding was selected to host the Challenge Cup final

In 1933 the cricket ground was demolished making way for the Oldham Greyhound Stadium; the south stand and kennels were erected next to the south-east corner of the Watersheddings ground. The Watersheddings floodlights were used for the first time on Wednesday 20 October 1965, when a crowd of 6,333 attended an under-24 international between Great Britain and France.

Closure 
The club left Watersheddings in 1997 and, now called Oldham R.L.F.C., moved to Oldham Athletic AFC's Boundary Park stadium before they moved to Whitebank Stadium in 2010. The Watersheddings site was redeveloped into housing now called Watersheddings Way and Hutchins Lane.

County games 
Watersheddings also hosted numerous county vs county games with Lancashire hosting various other county sides including the Rugby League War of the Roses matches against Yorkshire. The results were as follows:

Australia and New Zealand 
The stadium, in its time, played host to many Australian and New Zealand national teams who played tour games against Oldham and the Lancashire county side, the first being against the 1907 touring New Zealand team, the last being against Australia in 1986.

References 

Buildings and structures in Oldham
Defunct rugby league venues in England
Sports venues in Greater Manchester
Sport in Oldham